John Alan Robinson (9 March 1930 – 5 August 2016) was a philosopher, mathematician, and computer scientist. He was a professor emeritus at Syracuse University.

Alan Robinson's major contribution is to the foundations of automated theorem proving. His unification algorithm eliminated one source of combinatorial explosion in resolution provers; it also prepared the ground for the logic programming paradigm, in particular for the Prolog language. 
Robinson received the 1996 Herbrand Award for Distinguished Contributions to Automated reasoning.

Life 
Robinson was born in Halifax, Yorkshire, England in 1930 and left for the United States in 1952 with a classics degree from Cambridge University. He studied philosophy at the University of Oregon before moving to Princeton University where he received his PhD in philosophy in 1956. He then worked at Du Pont as an operations research analyst, where he learned programming and taught himself mathematics. He moved to Rice University in 1961, spending his summers as a visiting researcher at the Argonne National Laboratory's Applied Mathematics Division. He moved to Syracuse University as Distinguished Professor of Logic and Computer Science in 1967 and became professor emeritus in 1993.

It was at Argonne that Robinson became interested in automated theorem proving and developed unification and the resolution principle. Resolution and unification have since been incorporated in many automated theorem-proving systems and are the basis for the inference mechanisms used in logic programming and the programming language Prolog.

Robinson was the Founding Editor of the Journal of Logic Programming, and has received numerous honours. These include a Guggenheim Fellowship in 1967, the American Mathematical Society Milestone Award in Automatic Theorem Proving 1985, an AAAI Fellowship 1990, the Herbrand Award for Distinguished Contributions to Automatic Reasoning 1996, and the Association for Logic Programming honorary title Founder of Logic Programming in 1997. He has received honorary Doctorates from Katholieke Universiteit Leuven 1988, Uppsala University 1994, and Universidad Politecnica de Madrid 2003. Robinson died in Portland, Maine on 5 August 2016 from a ruptured aneurysm following surgery for pancreatic cancer.

In 1994, he received the Humboldt Senior Scientist Award at the request of Wolfgang Bibel, which included a six-month stay at the Department of Computer Science of the Technische Universität Darmstadt.

Selected publications 
 
Gabbay, Dov M.; Hogger, Christopher John; Robinson, J.A., eds. (1993-1998). Handbook of Logic in Artificial Intelligence and Logic Programming. Vols. 1-5, Oxford University Press.

See also 
  — an alternative to the Quine–McCluskey algorithm for Boolean function minimization

Notes

External links 
 
 Books listed by The MIT Press

1930 births
2016 deaths
British computer scientists
American computer scientists
20th-century British mathematicians
21st-century British mathematicians
20th-century American mathematicians
21st-century American mathematicians
University of Oregon alumni
Princeton University alumni
Rice University faculty
Syracuse University faculty
Formal methods people
British expatriates in the United States
Fellows of the Association for the Advancement of Artificial Intelligence
Academic journal editors
Alumni of the University of Cambridge
Mathematicians from New York (state)